Prince Leon Aleksander Sapieha (1883-1944) was a Polish military aviator, landowner, traveler, and a member of the Sejm.

His brother was Prince Adam Zygmunt Sapieha and his uncle the Polish cardinal Prince Adam Stefan Sapieha.

Bibliography
 Alina Szklarska-Lohmannowa: Sapieha Leon. W: Polski Słownik Biograficzny. T. 35. Warszawa – Kraków: Polska Akademia Nauk – Instytut Historii im. Tadeusza Manteuffla, 1994, s. 81–83. .

1883 births
1944 deaths
Polish aviators
Leon Aleksander
Home Army members
Members of the Sejm of the Republic of Poland
Austro-Hungarian World War I pilots
Recipients of the Cross of Valour (Poland)
Resistance members killed by Nazi Germany